Nikolay Gavrilovich Latyshev (November 22, 1913 – February 18, 1999) was the referee in the 1962 FIFA World Cup Final staged in Santiago between Brazil and Czechoslovakia.

He was the first FIFA referee from the Soviet Union (since 1952), as well as the first Soviet to be appointed to officiate in a World Cup final.

Prior to the referee career, Latyshev played for FC Elektrozavod, Stalinets, and Dynamo Moscow.

References

External links 
Biography 

Nikolay Latyshev

FIFA World Cup Final match officials
Russian football referees
Soviet football referees
FC Dynamo Moscow players
1913 births
1999 deaths
1962 FIFA World Cup referees
Sportspeople from Moscow
Burials at Vagankovo Cemetery
Recipients of the Order of Honour (Russia)
Russian academics

Association footballers not categorized by position
Soviet footballers